Cranbourne is an electoral district of the Victorian Legislative Assembly. It is located south-east of Melbourne and includes the suburbs of Botanic Ridge, Cranbourne, Cranbourne East, Cranbourne North, Cranbourne West, Junction Village, as well as parts of Clyde, Clyde North, Cranbourne South, Devon Meadows, Lynbrook and Lyndhurst. It was created prior to the 1992 state election.

Cranbourne was held by Jude Perera of the Labor Party from 2002 to 2018, with a two-party preferred margin of 2.3% at the 2014 state election. However, from 1992 to the 2002 election the seat was held by the Liberal Party, albeit with different boundaries that were more favourable to the Liberals. Additionally, the Victorian State Liberals suffered a statewide swing against them that saw them lose two-thirds of their seats at the 2002 state election.

Perera re-contested the seat at the 2006 election, and defeated Luke Martin of the Liberal Party. Perera held the seat again in 2010, holding off a challenge from ex-VFL player and brother of Gary Ablett Sr., Geoff Ablett.

In September 2017, Perera announced he will not be running at the November 2018 state election. He was succeeded by Pauline Richards.

Members for Cranbourne

Election results

Graphical summary

References

External links
 Electorate profile: Cranbourne District, Victorian Electoral Commission

1992 establishments in Australia
Electoral districts of Victoria (Australia)
City of Casey
Electoral districts and divisions of Greater Melbourne